The Gabon women's national handball team is the national team of Gabon. It is governed by the Fédération Gabonaise de Handball and takes part in international handball competitions.

African Championship record
1979 – 9th
1983 – 9th
1987 – 7th
2000 – 8th
2002 – 7th
2006 – 7th
2008 – 8th

External links
IHF profile

Women's national handball teams
Handball
National team